Omagh East (named after Omagh town) is a barony  in County Tyrone, Northern Ireland. It is bordered by nine other baronies: Omagh West and Lurg to the west; Strabane Lower and Strabane Upper to the north; Dungannon Middle and Dungannon Upper to the east; Clogher and Tirkennedy to the south; and Dungannon Lower to the south-east.

List of main settlements
 Beragh
 Carrickmore
 Dromore
 Omagh

List of civil parishes
Below is a list of civil parishes in Omagh East:
 Cappagh (split with Strabane Upper)
 Clogherny
 Donacavey (split with barony of Clogher)
 Dromore
 Drumragh
 Kilskeery
 Magheracross (split with barony of Tirkennedy)
 Termonmaguirk (split with barony of Strabane Upper)

References